Box Primary School, also known as Box Church of England Primary School, is a state-run primary school in Box, Wiltshire, England. The current headteacher is Ms Jo French.

History
The first school in the village was set up in 1708 by the vicar, the Rev. George Millard. In 1710 Lady Rachel Speke (1657–1711), eldest daughter of Sir William Wyndham, left £100 for the school and other members of the Speke family also bequeathed money. This was for "teaching poor children to read and instructing them in the knowledge and practice of the Christian religion, as professed and taught in the Church of England". Box Primary School thus has over 300 years of history, making it the fourth oldest existing school in Wiltshire.

Building
The school has been in its present Grade II listed Victorian building since 1875. Grade II means "buildings that are of special interest, warranting every effort to preserve them". It was built as an elementary Board church school in 1875 at a cost of £2,700 and it could accommodate 400 pupils. An extension was built on in 2005.

References

External links

See also
List of oldest schools in Wiltshire
List of schools in Wiltshire

Box, Wiltshire
Primary schools in Wiltshire
Educational institutions established in 1708
1708 establishments in England
Voluntary controlled schools in England